The Trans Africa Railway Corporation is a company that runs the break of gauge transshipment station at Kidatu, Tanzania.

Gauge 
To the north of Kidatu is the  system of Tanzania, Kenya and Uganda.

To the south of Kitadu is the  system of TAZARA, Zambia and the rest of southern Africa.

Transhipment 

Kitadu is fitted with large cranes which help tranship goods, especially containers, from wagons of one gauge to wagons of another gauge.

See also
 East African Railway Master Plan
 Rail transport in Tanzania
 Transport in Tanzania
 TAZARA

References

Railway companies of Tanzania